"Name and Number" (stylised on the single as "Name & No.") is a song by British musical group Curiosity Killed the Cat. Released as a single on 4 September 1989, the song peaking at number 14 on the UK Singles Chart.

Background 
"Name and Number" was recorded at Ridge Farm Studios just after Christmas 1988 and mixed at Rak Studios in January 1989. Along with the four band members, the session was augmented by Paul "Wix" Wickens - keyboards from Paul McCartney's band and Molly Duncan (ex-Average White Band) on saxophone. The song was produced and mixed by Glenn Skinner with engineering by Glenn Skinner, Ren Swan, and Neil Brockbank.

Track listings 
7-inch and cassette single (CAT 6; CATMC 6)
 "Name and Number" – 3:59
 "Keep on Trying" –  4:08

12-inch single (CATX 6)
 "Name and Number" (extended mix) – 5:32
 "Name and Number" (A Schizo version) – 4:26
 "Name and Number" (Club Sandwich mix) – 4:21
 "Keep On Trying" – 4:38

CD single (CATCD 6)
 "Name and Number"
 "Name and Number" (Hanging On Person to Person)
 "Keep On Trying"
 "Name and Number" (Jazzy Dub version)

Charts

Samples 
 "Name and Number" was widely sampled in the chorus of "Ring Ring Ring (Ha Ha Hey)", a 1991 hit song by American hip hop group De La Soul. Jaheim's 2009 single "Ain't Leavin Without You" borrows a similar chorus. Little Mix's 2013 single "How Ya Doin?" is heavily based on it, with almost the same chorus and only changing the verses.

References 

1989 singles
1989 songs
Curiosity Killed the Cat songs
Mercury Records singles
Phonogram Records singles